The Kerala Football Association (abbreviated Kerala FA), formerly the Travancore-Cochin Football Association, is one of the 37 Indian state football associations that are affiliated to the All India Football Federation (AIFF). The Kerala FA administers lower tier football in the state of Kerala.

History 
football has been a passion of thousands of Malayalees for the last several decades—much before the state of Kerala was formed on 1 November 1956. Kerala Football Association was formed in 1948 to directly oversees the development of football in Kerala from grassroots to senior level.

Later the headquarters of KFA was moved to Kollam after P. Laxmanan Pillai was elected president and K. Thankappan honorary secretary. KFA saw a new breed of organizers taking over the reins in the 1970s with former mayor of Cochin A. K. Seshadri becoming its president.

2021 privatization 
On 9 October 2021, Kerala Football Association signed a twelve year long deal with Meeran Sports LLP and Scoreline Sports Pvt Ltd. The deal was inspired from masterplan prepared by Rob Baan, former technical director of AIFF. The consortium is responsible for getting investments worth around Rs 350 crore into the football ecosystem over the 12-year period. As per the agreement, consortium will form Kerala Super League, initially planned to further develop youth local players in senior transition.

Evolution

R B Ferguson Club
R B Ferguson Club is the oldest football club in Kerala and South India. It was established on 20 February 1899 in Thrissur (Thrissivaperur). The club was named after the Kochi police superintendent, R B Ferguson.

Kerala Premier League

As a step to give more competence and professionalism for the football clubs in Kerala, KFA launched the Kerala Premier League in January 2014. Twelve teams participated in the first season.

References

External links
https://keralafa.com/
https://www.the-aiff.com/association/495
Football Kerala
Kerala State Football Championship
Revive the Kerala State League, says Jo Paul Ancheri

Football governing bodies in India
Football in Kerala
1948 establishments in India
Sports organizations established in 1948
Organisations based in Kochi